The Federal Ministry of Information and National Orientation is a former ministry in the Government of Nigeria. The ministry was dissolved on January 11, 2007, when its responsibilities were restructured into the Nigerian Federal Ministry of Information and Communications and the Nigerian Federal Ministry of Tourism, Culture and National Orientation.

References

Federal Ministries of Nigeria